Anni Vuohijoki (born 24 May 1988) is a Finnish weightlifter. She competed in the women's 63 kg event at the 2016 Summer Olympics.

References

External links
 
 
 
 

1988 births
Living people
Finnish female weightlifters
Olympic weightlifters of Finland
Weightlifters at the 2016 Summer Olympics
Place of birth missing (living people)
European Weightlifting Championships medalists
21st-century Finnish women